"Perfect Gentleman" is the third single released from Haitian rapper Wyclef Jean's second studio album, The Ecleftic: 2 Sides II a Book. It features a guest verse by rapper and co-writer Hope Harris. The song cites Chris Rock's spoken-word piece "No Sex (In the Champagne Room)".

"Perfect Gentleman" was released in the United States on 30 January 2001 and reached number eight on the Billboard Bubbling Under Hot R&B/Hip-Hop Songs chart; it failed to chart on the Billboard Hot 100. Internationally, the song peaked within the top 10 in Denmark, Germany, Ireland, Norway, Sweden, and the United Kingdom. In the latter country, the song was certified gold by the British Phonographic Industry (BPI).

Chart performance
In the United Kingdom, "Perfect Gentleman" peaked at number four on the UK Singles Chart and spent a total of 20 weeks on the chart. In 2013, the song re-appeared on the chart at number 70. In December 2017, the single was certified gold by the British Phonographic Industry (BPI), denoting sales and streams of 400,000 units in Britain. The song is also certified gold in Sweden, where it reached number four as well.

Music video
The music video was shot in Washington D.C. and features a scene outside The White House. The video shows Wyclef Jean in a large ballroom, performing the song to the crowd. It later features Jean as a college dean, outlining his plans for being the Perfect Gentleman. One of the songswriters, Harry Tait, makes a guest appearance in the video.

Track listings

UK CD single 
 "Perfect Gentleman" (LP version) – 4:09
 "Perfect Gentleman" (vinyl remix featuring Xzibit and King Yellowman) – 4:38
 "Perfect Gentleman" (Kelly G House mix) – 8:25
 "Perfect Gentleman" (CD extra video)

UK 12-inch single 
A1. "Perfect Gentleman" (remix—vinyl mix featuring Xzibit and King Yellowman) – 4:38
A2. "Perfect Gentleman" (remix instrumental) – 4:38
B1. "Perfect Gentleman" (Kelly G House Mix) – 8:25
B2. "Perfect Gentleman" (Kelly G House Mix instrumental) – 8:25

UK cassette single 
 "Perfect Gentleman" (LP version) – 4:09
 "Perfect Gentleman" (vinyl remix featuring Xzibit and King Yellowman) – 4:38

European CD single 
 "Perfect Gentleman" (radio edit) – 3:19
 "Perfect Gentleman" (remix radio edit) – 3:59

Australian CD single 
 "Perfect Gentleman" (radio edit) – 3:19
 "Perfect Gentleman" (remix radio edit) – 3:59
 "Perfect Gentleman" (Kelly G House mix) – 8:25
 "911" (video version)

Credits and personnel
Credits and personnel are taken from The Ecleftic: 2 Sides II a Book album booklet.

Studios
 Recorded and mixed at The Hit Factory (New York City)
 Mastered at Sterling Sound (New York City)

Personnel

 Wyclef Jean – writing, vocals, production
 Jerry "Wonder" Duplessis – writing (as Jerry Duplessis), production
 Hope Harris – writing, vocals
 Joe Di Marco – additional background vocals
 Farel Sedeck Guerschom Jean – co-production
 Andy Grassi – recording, mixing, mastering
 Chris Gehringer – mastering
 Serge "Sergical" Tsai – mastering

Charts

Weekly charts

Year-end charts

Certifications

Release history

Cover versions
"Perfect Gentleman" was covered by the reggae rock band Slightly Stoopid on their 2003 LP Everything You Need. Harry Tait also covered this on his acoustic album named All the Things I Love and More, which debuted at number 99 on the UK Albums Chart.

References

2000 songs
2001 singles
Columbia Records singles
Song recordings produced by Jerry Duplessis
Songs written by Jerry Duplessis
Songs written by Wyclef Jean
Wyclef Jean songs
Miami bass songs